Araotes is a small Indomalayan genus of butterflies in the family Lycaenidae.

Species
 Araotes lapithis (Moore, [1858]) - witch
 Araotes perrhaebis Semper, 1890 Philippines

References

Deudorigini
Theclinae
Taxa named by William Doherty